The following is a list of some research labs at the University of Massachusetts Amherst:

College of Natural Sciences 

 Apiary Laboratory (entomology, microbiology)
 Genomic Resource Laboratory (molecular biology)
Massachusetts Center for Renewable Energy Science and Technology
 Amherst Center for Fundamental Interactions (http://www.physics.umass.edu/acfi/)
Center for Applied Mathematics and Mathematical Computation
 Center for Geometry, Analysis, Numerics, and Graphics (www.gang.umass.edu)
Pediatric Physical Activity Laboratory (PPAL)

College of Engineering (CoE)

Electrical and Computer Engineering (ECE) labs 

 Antennas and Propagation Laboratory
 Architecture and Real-Time Systems Laboratory
 Center for Advanced Sensor and Communication Antennas (CASCA)
 Complex Systems Modeling and Control Laboratory
Emerging Nanoelectronics Laboratory
Engineering Research Center for Collaborative Adaptive Sensing of the Atmosphere (CASA)
 Feedback Control Systems Lab
High-Dimensional Signal Processing Lab
 Information Systems Laboratory
Integrated Nanobiotechnology Lab
 Laboratory for Millimeter Wavelength Devices and Applications
Microwave Remote Sensing Laboratory (MIRSL)
 Multimedia Networks Laboratory
Multimedia Networks and Internet Laboratory
Nanodevices and Integrated Systems Laboratory
Nanoelectronics Theory and Simulation Laboratory
Nanoscale Computing Fabrics & Cognitive Architectures Lab
Network Systems Laboratory
Photonics Laboratory
Reconfigurable Computing Laboratory
Sustainable Computing Lab
VLSI CAD Laboratory
VLSI Circuits and Systems Laboratory
Wireless Systems Laboratory
 Yield and Reliability of VLSI Circuits

Mechanical and Industrial Engineering (MIE) Labs 

 Arbella Insurance Human Performance Laboratory (Engineering Laboratory Building)
 Center for Energy Efficiency and Renewable Energy
 Multi-Phase Flow Simulation Laboratory
 Soil Mechanics Laboratories (located at Marston Hall and ELAB-II)
 Wind Energy Center (formerly the Renewable Energy Research Laboratory)

College of Information & Computer Sciences (CICS) 

 Autonomous Learning Laboratory
 Center for Intelligent Information Retrieval
 Center for e-Design
 Knowledge Discovery Laboratory
 Laboratory For Perceptual Robotics
 Resource-Bounded Reasoning Laboratory

Other

 Center for Economic Development
 Center for Education Policy
 Labor Relations and Research Center
 National Center for Digital Governance
 Political Economy Research Institute
 Scientific Reasoning Research Institute
 The Environmental Institute
 Virtual Center for Supernetworks

References

University of Massachusetts Amherst